The Troutdale Centennial Arch is a  arch spanning the Historic Columbia River Highway in Troutdale, Oregon, United States. The arch rests on piers created by Michael Byrne and has bronze sculptures of salmon by Rip Caswell.

References

External links

 
 Gateway to the Gorge at Caswell Sculpture
  (March 16, 2010), Daily Journal of Commerce
 Troutdale Centennial Arch at Bremik Construction

Arches and vaults in the United States
Fish in art
Outdoor sculptures in Oregon
Troutdale, Oregon